Ahn Seung-In is a South Korean former professional footballer and current manager of Chungju Hummel. He made his debut on 1999, playing for Bucheon SK. He appeared in 117 games in his whole career, scored 7 goals and made 8 assists.

References

External links 
 

1973 births
Living people
South Korean footballers
South Korean football managers
Jeju United FC players
K League 1 players
Chungju Hummel FC managers
Association football midfielders